Pierre-Jacques Volaire (1729 – 1790s), was a French painter.

He was born in Toulon as the son of the official city painter and writer., and became the pupil of Claude Joseph Vernet. He was his assistant for eight years and known for landscapes and marines.
He died in Naples.

References

Pierre-Jacques Volaire on Artnet

1729 births
1790s deaths
18th-century French painters
Artists from Toulon